Brian Patrick McKeon (born February 11, 1964) is an American attorney and national security advisor who served as the Deputy Secretary of State for Management and Resources in the Biden Administration from March 2021 to December 2022.

Early life and education 
McKeon was born and raised in Auburn, New York, graduating from Auburn High School in 1981. He earned a Bachelor of Arts degree in government and international relations from University of Notre Dame in 1985 and a Juris Doctor from the Georgetown University Law Center in 1995.

Career 

During law school, McKeon was a law clerk for Judge Robert G. Doumar of the United States District Court for the Eastern District of Virginia. From 1987 to 1995, McKeon worked in the office of then-Senator Joe Biden, including as a legislative assistant specializing in foreign policy and defense. From 1997 to 2009, he was chief counsel for Democratic members of the United States Senate Committee on Foreign Relations. After Biden became vice president of the United States, McKeon was selected to serve as his deputy national security advisor. He later became the COO for the United States National Security Council (NSC). From 2012 to 2014, he was executive secretary of the NSC. McKeon served as principal deputy Under Secretary of Defense for Policy from 2014 to 2017. After leaving the Obama Administration, McKeon became the executive director of the Penn Biden Center at the University of Pennsylvania. He has also written columns on national security issues for Just Security.

Biden administration
On January 16, 2021, it was announced that McKeon would be nominated to serve as Deputy Secretary of State for Management and Resources in the incoming Biden Administration. On February 13, 2021, his nomination was sent to the Senate. On March 11, 2021, his nomination was reported out of the Senate Foreign Relations Committee. On March 18, 2021, his nomination was confirmed in the Senate by voice vote. He was sworn into office on March 19, 2021. He resigned on December 31, 2022.

References

External links

1964 births
Living people
People from Auburn, New York
University of Notre Dame alumni
Georgetown University Law Center alumni
Obama administration personnel
United States Deputy Secretaries of State
Biden administration personnel